

Mayors of Richmond, California

References

.
Rich